Kardia may refer to:

 Kardia (Thrace), ancient Greek colony on the Thracian Chersonese
 Kardia, Kozani, a village in the municipality Eordaia, Kozani regional unit, Greece 
 Kardia, Thessaloniki, a village in the municipality Thermi, Thessaloniki regional unit, Greece 
 Kardia (film), 2006 Canadian film
 Kardia, a Greek term for heart often used as a prefix
 Kardia, an Apple Watch EKG monitoring device and application provided by Alivecor